Tatiana Grabuzova (born 9 February 1967) is a Russian chess player. She received the FIDE title of Woman Grandmaster (WGM) in 1994.

Biography
Tatiana Grabuzova started play chess in her native Kazan, later her family moved to Minsk, where she trained at Mikhail Shereshevsky. She graduated from Russian State University of Physical Education, Sport, Youth and Tourism in Moscow.

In 1985, Grabuzova won the USSR selection chess tournament for the World Junior Chess Championship in the U20 girls age group. she five times won Moscow City Women's Chess Championship (1986, 1991, 1997, 2003, 2007). In 1992, Tatiana Grabuzova won the Russian Women's Chess Cup. In 1995, in Krefeld she won German Women's Open Chess Championship. Tatiana Grabuzova is winner of many international chess tournaments, including winning Bled (1990), Moscow (1992), Tallinn (2006).

In 2001, Tatiana Grabuzova participated in Women's World Chess Championship by knock-out system and in the first round won to Julia Ryjanova but in second round lost to Corina Peptan.

References

External links
 
 
 

1967 births
Living people
Russian female chess players
Soviet female chess players
Chess woman grandmasters
Sportspeople from Kazan